Grand Island Senior High School may refer to:

Grand Island Senior High School (Nebraska) in Grand Island, Nebraska
Grand Island Senior High School (New York) in Grand Island, New York
also see Grand Island Central School District